Zahrat adh-Dhraʻ 2 or ZAD 2 is an early Neolithic archeological site  north of the village of edh-Dhra on the Lisan Peninsula, in modern-day Jordan.

The site is a low, small tell mound, located in what is now an arid region that would have been far more hospitable during the settlement's occupation. Several rounded stone buildings were found with plaster floors although lime-firing pyrotechnology was probably not used in their preparation. Archaeobotanical studies suggested that cultivation of wild crops was likely to have occurred on site. A large number of flint tools were found including sickles, picks, axes, drills, arrowheads and scrapers made from local flint sources. A few examples of stone tools made from other materials such as quartz, obsidian and quartzite were discovered. Other discoveries included a ceramic figure, greenstone, some copper ore and two incised fragments of burnt limestone showing geometric designs suggesting early Neolithic use of art and symbols. Radiocarbon dates for the site range between 9140 and 8470 BC. This has suggested occupation during the Pre-Pottery Neolithic A and possibly during the transitional phase into the Pre-Pottery Neolithic B between 8800 and 8600 BC that was identified in 2002 by Danielle Stordeur and Frédéric Abbès.

Ghattas Jeries Sayej analyzed the lithic assemblage from the site providing comparison with other sites in the southern Levant. He found little discernible difference between the Khiamian and Sultanian assemblages and argued for an extension of the PPNA and later start of the PPNB in the Southern Levant around 9200 BP.

References

External links
 www.exoriente.org - Radiocarbon dates for ZAD 2
 Phillip C. Edwards profile at La Trobe University

Populated places established in the 10th millennium BC
1999 archaeological discoveries
Archaeological sites in Jordan
Neolithic settlements
Pre-Pottery Neolithic B
Pre-Pottery Neolithic A